On the Front Line is the fifth album from hardcore punk band The Casualties. It is their second release under Side One Dummy Records, and arguably their most famous with that label. It was released in 2004, and re-released in 2005, as En la Línea del Frente, which was recorded with Spanish vocals, the mother tongue of Jorge, lead singer. It is their best selling album.

Track listing

Personnel
The Casualties
Jorge Herrera- lead vocals 
Rick Lopez - vocals, bass guitar
Jake Kolatis - vocals, guitar 
Marc "Meggers" Eggers - drums

Artwork 
BrandNewAge - album design
Mick Stern - enhanced CD design
Helen Cotter, Paul Cotter, Jocelyn Dean, Greg Dixon, & Michelle Dosson	- photography

Production
 Bill Stevenson – producer, engineer, mixing
 Jason Livermore – producer, engineer, mastering

Chart history

Appearance in other media
 The song Unknown Soldier was used as part of the Tony Hawk's Underground 2 soundtrack.

2004 albums
The Casualties albums
SideOneDummy Records albums
Albums produced by Bill Stevenson (musician)